Tiermes may refer to:

 Termancia (Tiermes), an ancient city in Spain.

 Tiermes, the Sami god of thunder and rain